The Moon and the Son: An Imagined Conversation is a 2005 animated short film directed by animation historian John Canemaker.

Accolades
2006: Academy Award for Best Animated Short Film (won)

Summary
Filmmaker John and producer/co-writer Peggy Stern employ a combination of animation, home movies and photos to present an imagined conversation between a son (voiced by John Turturro) and an abusive, late father (voiced by Eli Wallach).

See also
Ryan, 2004 Oscar-winning Canadian animated  short film similar in concept
Animated documentary
2005 in film

References

External links

 
The Moon and the Son: An Imagined Conversation on FilmAffinity
Amazon.com

2005 films
2005 animated films
2000s animated short films
American animated short films
Best Animated Short Academy Award winners
Films about child abuse
Documentary films about animation
Films about dysfunctional families
2000s English-language films
2000s American films